The  was a professional wrestling world heavyweight championship of the Japanese professional wrestling promotion known as . It was the first Japanese heavyweight title to be billed as a World title, and in the 1970s and early 1980s it was one of the most important titles in Japan. The title died with the promotion in 1981 but was later revived by Goro Tsurumi for his independent Kokusai Promotion.

There have been eighteen reigns between twelve wrestlers, and three vacancies.

Title history

Combined reigns

See also
NWA International Heavyweight Championship
PWF Heavyweight Championship
NWF Heavyweight Championship

References

External links
IWA World Heavyweight Title History (in Japanese)

World heavyweight wrestling championships